Gompholobium gompholobioides is a species of flowering plant in the family Fabaceae and is endemic to the south-west of Western Australia. It is a spreading shrub with pinnate leaves and uniformly yellow, pea-like flowers.

Description
Flowering occurs from September to March and the fruit is a pod.

Taxonomy
This pea was first formally in 1876 by Ferdinand von Mueller who gave it the name Burtonia gompholobioides in Fragmenta Phytographiae Australiae. In 1987, Michael Crisp changed the name to Gompholobium gompholobioides. The specific epithet (gompholobioides) means "like Gastrolobium" - the species was initially given the name Burtonia gompholobioides.

Distribution and habitat
This pea grows on sand dunes and plains in the Avon Wheatbelt, Coolgardie, Esperance Plains, Geraldton Sandplains, Great Victoria Desert, Mallee and Yalgoo biogeographic regions in the far west of Western Australia.

Conservation status
Gompholobium gompholobioides is classified as "not threatened" by the Government of Western Australia Department of Parks and Wildlife.

References

gompholobioides
Eudicots of Western Australia
Plants described in 1876
Taxa named by Ferdinand von Mueller